The 2014–15 Incarnate Word Cardinals men's basketball team represented the University of the Incarnate Word during the 2014–15 NCAA Division I men's basketball season. The Cardinals were led by ninth year head coach Ken Burmeister and played their home games at McDermott Convocation Center. They were members of the Southland Conference.

This was year 2 of a 4-year transitional period for Incarnate Word from DII to DI. During year 2 they will play a normal conference schedule. They are DI for scheduling purposes and are also to be considered as a DI RPI member.

Although Incarnate Word was classified as a DI school for scheduling purposes in years 2–4 and can win the regular season conference title, they cannot participate in the conference tournament until the 2017–18 season, at which time they will also be able to enter the NCAA Tournament, should they win the conference.

The Cardinals were picked to finish sixth (6th) in both the Southland Conference Coaches' Poll and the Sports Information Directors Poll.

They finished the season 18–11, 10–8 in Southland play to finish in fifth place. They were invited to the CollegeInsider.com Postseason Tournament, their first ever DI postseason appearance, where they lost in the first round to Louisiana–Lafayette.

Audio streaming
All Incarnate Word games were broadcast on KKYX's website. KUIW Radio also produced a student media broadcast for each non-televised home game, that was available online, and they provided streaming of all non-televised home games were shown via UIW TV.

Roster

Schedule and Results

|-
!colspan=9 style="" | Non-Conference

|-
!colspan=9 style="" | Conference Games

|-
!colspan=9 style="" |

See also
2014–15 Incarnate Word Cardinals women's basketball team

References

Incarnate Word Cardinals men's basketball seasons
Incarnate Word
Incarnate Word Cardinals men's basketball
Incarnate Word Cardinals men's basketball
Incarnate Word